Human Epigenome Project (HEP) is a multinational science project, with the stated aim to "identify, catalog, and interpret genome-wide DNA methylation patterns of all human genes in all major tissues". It is financed by government funds as well as private investment, via a consortium of genetic research organisations.

The call for such a project was widely suggested and supported by cancer research scientists from all over the world.

Consortium
The HEP consortium is made up of the following organizations:
The Wellcome Trust Sanger Institute — UK
Epigenomics AG — Germany/USA
The Centre National de Génotypage — France

See also 
Human epigenome

References

External links
Human Epigenome Project

Epigenetics
Human genome projects

Genome projects
Bioinformatics